The Taunton by-election was a Parliamentary by-election held for the British House of Commons constituency of Taunton in Somerset on 11 November 1912. Taunton returned one Member of Parliament (MP)  to the House of Commons of the United Kingdom, elected by the first past the post voting system.

Vacancy
William Peel had been Unionist MP for Taunton since 1909. He inherited his father's viscountcy in 1912, and moved to the House of Lords.

Previous result

Result

Aftermath
A General Election was due to take place by the end of 1915. By the summer of 1914, the following candidates had been adopted to contest that election. Due to the outbreak of war, the election never took place.

In 1918, Wills switched to contest the neighbouring seat of Weston super mare.

Boles was the endorsed candidate of the Coalition Government.

References

 Craig, F. W. S. (1974). British parliamentary election results 1885-1918 (1 ed.). London: Macmillan.
 Who's Who: www.ukwhoswho.com
 Debrett's House of Commons 1916

1913 in England
1913 elections in the United Kingdom
History of Taunton
By-elections to the Parliament of the United Kingdom in Somerset constituencies
20th century in Somerset